Protognathus  may refer to:
 Protognathus, genus of ground beetle described in 1950 but later considered as a synonym of Pseudognathaphanus.
 Protognathosaurus, genus of sauropod that is originally described as Protognathus.
 Protognathodus, genus of conodont, sometimes described as Protognathus.
 Protognathinus, genus of extinct beetle that is sometimes misspelled as Protognathus.

References 

Genus disambiguation pages